The Levi Heywood Memorial Library Building is an historic library building at 28 Pearl Street in Gardner, Massachusetts.  Completed in 1886, it is one of the city's most architecturally distinguished buildings, and a good example of Richardsonian Romanesque design.  It was given in honor of Levi Heywood, a prominent figure in the city's economically important chair manufacturing industry.  It was used as a library until 1978, and now houses a museum dedicated to the city's history.  The building was listed on the National Register of Historic Places in 1979, and included in the Gardner Uptown Historic District in 1999.

Description and history
The Levi Heywood Memorial Library Building stands amid a cluster of civic and religious buildings in the historic civic center of Gardner, located east of its commercial downtown on the south side of Pearl Street.  It is a 1-1/2 story masonry structure, built out of red brick with brownstone and terra cotta trim, and covered by a slate roof.  Its main roof has a parapeted gable on the right end, and a polygonal bay with hip roof on the left.  A large gabled pavilion projects to the front, with an arched porch sheltering the main entrance projecting further.  Windows are set in round-arch openings with brownstone trim, and terra cotta panels adorn parts of the front facade.

Gardner's library was established in 1841, but had no permanent home prior to construction of this building.  It was built in 1885-86 to a design by Fuller & Delano, a prominent architectural firm in Worcester.  It was named for Levi Heywood, grandson of one of Gardner's founders, and an influential figure in the rise of the chair manufacturing industry that came to dominate Gardner's economy.  Its operations were originally funded by an endowment given by the Heywoods, but eventually came to need municipal funding.  It remained in use as the city's public library until 1978. A new facility was opened on West Lynde Street in 1998.  The building now houses the local history museum.

See also
 Levi Heywood Memorial Library, now located at 55 West Lynde St., Gardner, MA
 National Register of Historic Places listings in Worcester County, Massachusetts

References

External links
Gardner Museum website

Library buildings completed in 1885
Libraries on the National Register of Historic Places in Massachusetts
Libraries in Worcester County, Massachusetts
Buildings and structures in Gardner, Massachusetts
National Register of Historic Places in Worcester County, Massachusetts
Historic district contributing properties in Massachusetts
Museums in Worcester County, Massachusetts